Arthur Jenks may refer to:

Arthur B. Jenks (1866–1947), U.S. Representative from New Hampshire
Arthur Whipple Jenks (1863–1922), American Episcopal theologian